Paul, also known as New Providence, is an unincorporated community in Conecuh County, Alabama, United States.

History
Paul was named for Paul the Apostle. Paul was settled in the 1870s by immigrants from South Carolina. David Robinson served as the first postmaster.

A post office operated under the name Paul from 1908 to 1988.

The Old Paul Post Office was added to the Alabama Register of Landmarks and Heritage in 2013.

References

Unincorporated communities in Conecuh County, Alabama
Unincorporated communities in Alabama